Waenavon railway station, also known as Waen Avon, was a station on the Brynmawr and Blaenavon Railway in South East Wales. To the south of the station a short line served Milfraen Colliery.

History 
An extension to  opened in September 1879. The line was leased to the London and North Western Railway to transport coal to the Midlands via the Heads of the Valleys line. Waenavon station opened on 1 September 1871.

From the turn of the 20th century, the line served mining activity centred on several pits and collieries. The branch served several collieries between Brynmawr and Waen Avon. The first of these was the Waen Nantyglo Colliery, which was situated a little east of a tramway which later carried the B4248 Brynmawr to Blaenavon Road. The connection was removed by 1925. As Waenavon was approached on a facing branch to the left was built, leading to Clydach colliery, but these had gone by 1915, to be replaced by New Clydach Colliery sidings. Vestiges of these remained until 1950. The space between the single platform station at Waenavon and the branch was occupied by a series of loops and sidings.

By 1931, Milfraen Colliery had ceased production having exhausted its coal reserves and the branch line that served it was lifted in 1937. After the Depression and unemployment of the 1930s, passenger services were withdrawn from the station and the line on 5 May 1941 due to the exigencies of the Second World War. Blaenavon shed closed on 5 September 1942 and eventually goods services also ceased on 23 June 1954. The line was retained for wagon storage until 1953, and around 1950, a temporary siding was laid in connection with opencast workings on the Blorenge, branching east roughly at the point where the Milfraen Colliery branch had previously diverged west.

Coal traffic from Blaenavon continued until 8 October 1979 and the pit was closed in 1980 but the track remained down due to the prospect of its sale. A section from Big Pit, Blaenavon was subsequently sold to the Pontypool and Blaenavon Railway.

Present and future
The track from Brynmawr was lifted in July 1961 and the platforms were demolished. The station building still survives to this day and has now become a private residence known as 'Station House'.

Reopening the station to the public has become one of the long-term aims of the Pontypool and Blaenavon Railway.

However, the emphasis with the local authority is that this reopening will serve as a community link, rather than a tourist attraction.

References

Notes

Sources

External links
 Pontypool and Blaenavon Railway's development plan

Disused railway stations in Torfaen
History of Monmouthshire
Railway stations in Great Britain opened in 1871
Railway stations in Great Britain closed in 1941
Former London and North Western Railway stations